Olivier Elzéar Mathieu (24 December 1853 – 26 October 1929) was a Canadian Roman Catholic priest, academic, and Archbishop of Regina.

Biography
Born in Saint-Roch (Quebec City), the son of Joseph Mathieu and Marguerite Latouche, he studied at the Quebec Seminary and received a Doctor of Theology in 1878 from Université Laval. He was ordained a priest by Cardinal Elzéar-Alexandre Taschereau in 1878 and was appointed professor of philosophy at Laval University.

In 1882, he went to study in Borne, Italy and received a Doctor of Philosophy and Doctor of the Academy of Saint Thomas. Returning to Quebec, he received a Master of Arts in 1889. From 1899 to 1908, he was Rector of Université Laval.

Mathieu was appointed a Companion of the Order of St Michael and St George (CMG) during the visit to Canada of TRH the Duke and Duchess of Cornwall and York (later King George V and Queen Mary) in October 1901.
He was later created a Knight of the Légion d'honneur.

In 1911, he was appointed Bishop of Regina and Archbishop of Regina in 1915.

References

External links
 Archbishop Olivier Elzéar Mathieu at Catholic-Hierarchy

1853 births
1929 deaths
20th-century Roman Catholic archbishops in Canada
Rectors of Université Laval
Canadian Companions of the Order of St Michael and St George
Université Laval alumni
Chevaliers of the Légion d'honneur
Academic staff of Université Laval
Roman Catholic archbishops of Regina